Public Join-Stock Company First Investment Bank, commonly known as PJSC First Investment Bank is the Ukrainian bank that offers a full range of banking services to private and corporate customers. The bank was registered on 20 June 1997 with its headquarters at 6 Moskovskiy Avenue, Kyiv. There are over 30 branches in 11 regions of Ukraine.

History
 1997 – Registered as joint-stock bank with registered capital of UAH 2 210 thousand, received a license from the NBU to engage in banking operations.
 1998 – Member of International Payment System SWIFT (representative company in Ukraine is ProFIX), Member of the Ukrainian Interbank Currency Exchange, Member of the Professional Association of Registrars and Depositories. Issue of shares and capital increased to UAH 3 159 thousand.
 1999 – Issue of shares and capital increased of up to UAH 15 900.
 2000 – Member of the Fund Deposit Guarantee.
 2001 – Permission of NBU to deposit money in the share capital of other entities.
 2002 – Associate member of the Visa Inc. and an affiliate member of MasterCard Europe MasterCard International. Member of the Association of Ukrainian Banks and the Association of Ukrainian Credit-Bank Union. Issue of shares and capital increased to UAH 28 613 thousand.
 2003 – Reorganized into a joint-stock company.
 2004 – Issue of shares and capital increased to UAH 68 613 thousand.
 2005 – One of the founders of the LLC First Ukrainian Bureau of Credit Story, founded by the Association of Ukrainian Banks. Member of the Association "PFTS Stock Exchange." Ranked among the "Top 100 best financial institutions".
 2006 – With the permission of the NBU, the bank conducts the depository activity of securities. Member of the National System of Mass Electronic Payments. Member of the Ukrainian National Mortgage Association. Issue of shares and capital increased to UAH 149 999 thousand.
 2007 – 10 years of stable work in the market. 27th place as the best custodian in "TOP-100. The best financial institutions". Member of the Ukrainian Interbank Payment Systems Member Association "EMA". Subscription for shares in the amount of UAH 50 000. The decision to begin re-branding.
 2008 – Permission of the international payment system VISA International to issue bonus payment cards Visa Platinum. Getting Started Contact center. Start the certification process of business processes, according to the standard ISO 9001:2008. Increase in share capital up to UAH 200 million. The opening of offices in the cities of Dnipropetrovsk and Zaporizhia.
 2009 – The name was changed according to legislative requirements on public joint-stock company "First Investment Bank." PJSC "First Investment Bank." The first bank in Ukraine received an international certificate of quality management system conforming to the international standard ISO 9001:2008. The certification authority – an international company TÜV Rheinland Group (LLC TÜV Rheinland Ukraine, www.tuv.com.ua). Poltava and Nikolaev branch offices are opened.
 2010  – Issue of shares and share capital increased of up to UAH 230 million. Quality certification of management system to standard ISO 9001:2008. Confirmation of credit rating on National uaBBB-rating scale with a stable outlook.
 April,2011 Founding of the associated company is LTD "The Global pay network", testifying to registration of financial institution and License for realization of transfer of funds by non-bank financial institutions. Registration of the domestic non-bank payment system is initiated. Beginning of introduction of Control system of informative safety in accordance with the international standards of series of ISO/IEC 27001:2005 and ISO/IEC 27002:2005, subject to account modifications of the National bank of Ukraine, specified in the standards of ISO/IEC 27002 ISMS 1.0:2010 та ISO/IEC 27002 ISMS 2.0:2010.
 May, 2011 PJSC "First Investment Bank" successfully passed the second supervisory audit of the quality management system for compliance with ISO 9001:2008. In July, an independent authorized credit rating agency "ІBI-Rating» conferred to PJSC "First Investment Bank" the credit rating uaBBB+ by the National rating scale with forecast of rating  – stable. (RA "ІBI-Rating»)
 In early 2020, the National Bank of Ukraine approved the candidacy of Dmytro Yakovych Zolotko for the position of the Chairman of the Management Board of the bank, appointed by the Supervisory Board of the bank on December 16, 2019. Prior to his appointment, over the past 5 years, Dmytro Zolotko was an advisor to the Chairman of the Board of Ukrgasbank, Treasurer - Deputy Chairman of the Board of Ukrainian Sberbank.

Ratings and awards
 Ratings of PARD in 2010 Q3 – 13th place among 100 custodians in terms of accounting operations performed, 23rd place among the 100 custodians in terms of custody assets at nominal value;
 2010 PFTS ratings – 18th place to trade in shares of 114 dealers, 27 place for trade ІCІ of 42 dealers, 33 in trade in corporate bonds of 81 dealers.
 Credit rating on a national scale uaBBB-(investment with a stable projection. Data Credit-Rating Agency).
 Awards in the categories of All-Ukrainian contest "Best domestic goods 2008"
 Mortgage lending to individuals with the establishment of a mortgage investment object (real estate) in the primary market
 Program for the corporate Clients and online deposits
 The highest bid of the underwriting of securities
 Top 100 of the Best Financial Companies in 2007

 equity capital amounts to UAH 230,000,000 and 22,984,203 ordinary registered shares with a nominal value of UAH 10 per share. There are also 15 797 preferred stocks with a nominal value of UAH 10 per share.

Top-Management and Supervisory Board 
 Malkin Oleg Aleksandrovich – Chairman of the Board
 Polonskaya Elina Genrihovna – Deputy Chairman of the Board
 Sakhno Svetlana Vladimirovna – Deputy Chairman of the Board
 Prikhodko Svetlana Victorovna – Deputy Chairman of the Board
 Kolesnik Irina Victorovna – Chief Accountant
 Kolyada Vasiliy Petrovich – Head of Security Service

Bank details
 PJSC «First Investment Bank»
 Cor. account No. 32006176101 in the Main Department of the NBU in Kyiv and Kyiv region
 Sort Code 300506. EDRPOU 26410155
 Individual tax code No. 264101526657
 Certificate number VAT 100330414
 El. address of NBU UIST
 TELEX 131 169 FIBX UX
 SWIFT code FIBX UA UK

Licenses and Permits
 License No. 178 dated 05.10.2009 and Permission No. 178-4 of 05.10.2009 the right to conduct banking operations. Registered by NBU 20.06.1997 for No. 267;
 License for professional activity at the stock market – brokerage, series AG No.579894, issued by the State Committee on Securities and Stock market dated 23 September 2011, the decision to issue No.795 dated 18 August 2011, the term of the license to 24 September 2016
 License for professional activity at the stock market – dealer activity, series AG No.579895, issued by the State Committee on Securities and Stock market dated 23 September 2011, the decision to issue No.795 dated 18 August 2011, the term of the license to 24 September 2016
 License for professional activity at the stock market – underwriting, series AG No.579896, issued by the State Committee on Securities and Stock market dated 23 September 2011, the decision to issue No.795 dated 18 August 2011, the term of the license to 24 September 2016
 License for professional activity at the stock market – depositary activity viz. the depositary activity of the Custodian of securities, series AG No.579897, issued by the State Committee on Securities and Stock market dated 23 September 2011, the decision to issue No.796 dated 18 August 2011, the term of the license to 24 September 2016

Financial organizations

 PFTS Stock Exchange
 Ukrainian International Stock Exchange
 PJSC "Ukrainian Stock Exchange"
 ENPI "Register of borrowers"

Payment systems
 MasterCard International
 Visa Inc.
 National system of mass electronic payments (NSMEP)
 Reuters
 SWIFT
 Western Union
 MoneyGram
 Anelik
 Avers

Associations
 Association of Ukrainian Banks
 Professional Association of Registrars and Depositories (PARD)
 Ukrainian Interbank Association of Payment Systems Members  "EMA"
 Association "Ukrainian stock traders"
 Ukrainian National Mortgage Association (UNIA)

References

Notes
The correct romanization from the Ukrainian alphabet should spell Pershyi Investytsiynyi Bank.

External links 
  Official website

Banks of Ukraine
Organizations based in Kyiv
Ukrainian brands